The Fettesian-Lorettonians Club is a Scottish sporting club made up of former pupils of Fettes College and Loretto School. The club was founded in 1881 and has seen members of its club represent the Scotland national rugby union team.

Club history
The Fettesian-Lorettonians Club was formed in 1881, when a scratch team of ex-Fettes College students underwent a tour of North Yorkshire under the name Fettes Rovers in 1880. Failing to recruit a full team, the side approached the headmaster of rival college Loretto School, and requested if he would allow members of the Loretto XI could play for the team. Their request was granted, and the partnership between the two schools was so successful it was turned into a friendly sporting club. The original circular for the official formation of the club was signed by A. R. Paterson, a well known Lorretonian and Oxonian and Andrew Ramsay Don-Wauchope, representing Fettes and Cambridge. Although formed primarily as a rugby union club. the club also branched into other sports and athletics.

In March 1881, as part of the Home Nations encounters, Fettesian-Lorettonian were first represented at international level when Andrew Ramsay Don-Wauchope was chosen to play for Scotland against England. Don-Wauchope played 13 matches for Scotland, all whilst a playing club rugby for Fettesian-Lorettonian. Don-Wauchope was followed soon after by his younger brother Patrick, who won six caps for Scotland while representing the club. The most notable Scottish player was David Bedell-Sivright, who studied at Fettes, and made most of his international appearances with Cambridge University, but in 1901 made appearances against Ireland and Wales as a Fettesian-Lorettonian player. Beddell-Sivright was a major character of Scottish rugby and not only captained his country, but also led one of the earliest British Lions teams to Australia.

Past players of note
  David Bedell-Sivright
  Charles Berry
  Macbeth Duncan
  Andrew Ramsay Don-Wauchope
  Patrick Wauchope
  George Campbell Lindsay
  William MacLeod
  Charles Milne
  Lewis Robertson
  A. G. G. Asher

See also
 Merchistonians FC

External links
 Fettesian-Lorettonian Club Loretto School

Bibliography
 
 Massie, Allan A Portrait of Scottish Rugby (Polygon, Edinburgh)

References

Scottish rugby union teams
Rugby clubs established in 1881
Multi-sport clubs in the United Kingdom
1881 establishments in Scotland
Sports teams in Edinburgh
Rugby union in Edinburgh
Defunct Scottish rugby union clubs